Ivanka Vancheva (31 October 1953 – 5 August 2020) was a javelin thrower from Bulgaria, who set her personal best in 1980, throwing 65.38 metres. She competed for her native country at the 1980 Summer Olympics in Moscow, USSR, finishing in fifth place in the overall-rankings.

References

External links
sports-reference

1953 births
2020 deaths
Bulgarian female javelin throwers
Athletes (track and field) at the 1980 Summer Olympics
Olympic athletes of Bulgaria
Universiade medalists in athletics (track and field)
Sportspeople from Plovdiv
Universiade silver medalists for Bulgaria
Medalists at the 1977 Summer Universiade
Medalists at the 1979 Summer Universiade